= Noman Qamar =

Pakistani male model and retired athlete

Naeem Qamar
- Born: Naeem Qamar; 24 May; Lahore, Pakistan
- Occupations: Model, Baseball Player, Manager
- Modeling information
- Height: 6 ft 1 in (185 cm)
- Website: www.nomiqamar.com

Naeem "Nomi" Qamar (born in Lahore, Pakistan) is a Pakistani male model and retired athlete. He was a member of Pakistan's national baseball and athletics teams. At the age of 20, he started modelling. Since then, he has modelled for various Pakistani and International brands and was nominated for "Best Male Model of Year" in 2002. He has his own company, NQC.
